NWA or Nwa most commonly refers to:
 N.W.A ("Niggaz Wit Attitudes"), a hip hop group from Compton, California
 National Wrestling Alliance, a professional wrestling organization

NWA or Nwa may refer to:

Music
 New Weird America, a subgenre of psychedelic and indie music, popularized in the '60s and '70s

Places
 Nwa, Kale, a village in Burma
 Nwa, a commune in Donga-Mantung, Cameroon
 North Waziristan, an administrative region in Pakistan
 Northwest Arkansas, the Fayetteville–Springdale–Rogers metropolitan region of the U.S. state of Arkansas

Organizations

 Northwest Airlines (ICAO code), a defunct U.S. airline
 North-Western Area Command (RAAF), a defunct Royal Australian Air Force command
 National Weather Association, a U.S. meteorological society
 Neighborhood watch association, see neighborhood watch
 Nelson Weavers' Association, defunct British trade union
 New Women's Association, a Japanese women's rights organization (1919-1922)
 Nuer White Army, a militant organization active in South Sudan

Sports
 National Wrestling Association, a former offshoot of the U.S. National Boxing Association
 The NWA (wrestling stable), a 1998 U.S. wrestling stable

Other uses
 National Wildlife Area
 New Word Alive, a Christian conference held in Hafan Y Môr, Wales
 Northwest Afternoon, a former US television talk show
 Northwest Africa, a general region used in classification of meteorites